The William Lowndes Yancey Law Office is located at the corner of Washington and Perry Streets in Montgomery, Alabama.  It served as the law offices for one of the South's leading advocates of secession from the United States, William Lowndes Yancey, from 1846 until his death in 1863.  He joined with John A. Elmore to form a legal firm after his resignation from Congress on 1 September 1846.  Yancey wrote Alabama's Ordinance of Secession after the election of Abraham Lincoln and subsequently served as the Confederacy's Commissioner to England and France.

The building was listed on the National Register of Historic Places in 1973.  It was also declared a National Historic Landmark on 7 November 1973.  The building's interior included the historic floor plan and other decorative details when it was declared a landmark.  The late 1970s brought redevelopment of the site and the building was altered, this caused substantial losses to enough of the historic elements that the landmark designation was withdrawn on 5 March 1986.  The building remains on the National Register of Historic Places, however.

As a lawyer, populist legislator, firebrand orator, and party leader, William Lowndes Yancey was an important figure in sectional politics in the leadup to the Civil War. As one of the leading Southern Fire-Eaters, he gained national influence as an aggressive advocate of Slavery and States' Rights and exacerbated sectional differences that led to the secession of the Southern states from the Union. He had his law office in this building from 1846 until his death in 1863. Through successive modernizations and restorations in the 1970s and 1980s, the building lost much of the historic integrity for which it was originally designated a landmark, leading to the withdrawal of its designation. It was, however, retained on the National Register of Historic Places.

See also
List of National Historic Landmarks in Alabama

References

National Register of Historic Places in Montgomery, Alabama
Buildings and structures in Montgomery, Alabama
Commercial buildings completed in 1846
1846 establishments in Alabama
Former National Historic Landmarks of the United States
Law offices
Legal history of Alabama